A Deeper Level is a live worship album by Israel & New Breed. It was released in 2007 by Integrity Media. It is Houghton's seventh album, his sixth with Integrity, and his fourth live album.

The album was awarded a Grammy in 2008 as the Best Pop/Contemporary Gospel Album.

Track listing
Source: Amazon

NEW BREED

Band
Israel Houghton - Piano
Aaron Lindsey - Keyboards
Terrance Palmer - Bass
Johnny Najara - Guitar
Arthur Strong - Keyboards
Ryan Edgar - Acoustic Guitar
Mike Clemons - Drums
Justin Raines - Bass, Keyboard Bass
Eric Brice - Guitar
Justin Savage - Keyboards, Organ
Neville Diedericks - Guitar
Javier Solis - Percussion
Michael Gungor - Guitar
Jerry Harris - Keyboards, Programming
Christa Black - Violin
Vinnie Ciesielski - Trumpet
Jimmy Bolin - Saxophone
Roy Agee - Trombone

Vocalists
Olanrewaju Agbabiaka
Dakri Brown
Lois DuPlessis
Ryan Edgar
Jamil Freeman
Daniel Johnson
Rodney Jordan
Stacey Joseph
Mattie Blackburn
Sha' Simpson
Leah Smith
Danielle Stephens
Jeremiah Woods

Awards
In 2008, the album won a Dove Award for Contemporary Gospel Album of the Year at the 39th GMA Dove Awards.

References 

Israel Houghton albums
2007 live albums
Grammy Award for Best Pop/Contemporary Gospel Album